William Arthur Waldegrave, Baron Waldegrave of North Hill,  (born 15 August 1946) is a British Conservative Party politician who served as a Cabinet minister from 1990 until 1997, and is a life member of the Tory Reform Group. Since 1999, he has been a life peer in the House of Lords. Since 8 February 2009, Lord Waldegrave has been the Provost of Eton College. Additionally, he was inaugurated as Chancellor of the University of Reading on 9 December 2016.

Waldegrave's 2015 memoir, A Different Kind of Weather, discusses his high youthful political ambition, his political and to some extent personal life, and growing acceptance that he would not achieve his ultimate ambition. It also provides an account of the Heath, Thatcher and—to a lesser extent—Major governments, including his role in the development of the 'community charge' or poll tax. It includes a chapter entitled 'The Poll Tax – all my own work'.

Waldegrave served as a Trustee (1992–2011) and Chair (2002–2011) of the Rhodes Trust, during which time he also helped to create and served as a Trustee of the Mandela Rhodes Foundation. His portrait hangs at Rhodes House, Oxford.

He was the Chairman of Trustees of the National Museum of Science and Industry from 2002 to 2010.

Early life
Bearing the title The Honourable from birth as a younger son of an Earl, Waldegrave was the youngest (by six years) of the seven children of Mary Hermione Grenfell and the 12th Earl Waldegrave, his elder brother being the present Earl. His father's title was created five generations earlier for the diplomat and ambassador James Waldegrave, 1st Earl Waldegrave, whose grandfather was James II and VII.

Waldegrave is the nephew of the courtier Dame Frances Campbell-Preston and one of his sisters is Lady Susan Hussey, who became Baroness Hussey of North Bradley upon her husband's elevation to the House of Lords.

Education
Waldegrave was educated at Eton College, where he won the Newcastle Scholarship in 1965, and at the University of Oxford where he was an undergraduate student of Corpus Christi College, Oxford. During his study, he served for a term as president of the Oxford Union. Oxford was followed by Harvard University in the United States, on a Kennedy Scholarship. In 1971, he was elected a Prize Fellow of All Souls College, Oxford, and is now a distinguished fellow.

Early career
In 1971, Waldegrave was working at the Conservative Research Department; that March he was appointed to the Central Policy Review Staff (CPRS, also referred to as the 'Think-Tank'). "He was from the beginning one of the most active 'philosophers' of the CPRS, and the proponent of strong views about its proper roles and functions". He was one of the few openly political members of the staff and was used by Victor Rothschild, head of the CPRS, as a link with both the Conservative party (then in government) and the outside, non-Civil Service world. He left in December 1973.

Parliamentary career
He was elected to the House of Commons as Member of Parliament (MP) for Bristol West in 1979. He was regarded as a member of the "wet" or moderate tendency of the Conservative Party, and despite this progressed well from the backbenches in Margaret Thatcher's government.

As junior minister
He became a Parliamentary Under-Secretary of State at the Department of Education and Science in 1981 before moving to the Department of the Environment in 1983. He remained at Environment, becoming a Minister of State in 1985, until he became a Minister of State at the Foreign and Commonwealth Office in 1988. In this post he was involved in setting policy on arms exports to Iraq; the initial draft of the Scott Report found that he had agreed in February 1989 to relax the policy, but had sent out 38 untrue letters to Members of Parliament stating that the policy was unchanged. However, Sir Richard Scott exonerated Waldegrave of "duplicitous intent" in wrongly describing the Government's policy.

As a Cabinet minister
He was promoted to the Cabinet as Secretary of State for Health in November 1990, just days before Thatcher's resignation, and remained a member of the Cabinet throughout John Major's time as Prime Minister. He became Chancellor of the Duchy of Lancaster in the Cabinet Office with responsibility for public services and science in 1992, Secretary of State of Agriculture, Fisheries and Food in 1994 and Chief Secretary to the Treasury in 1995.

As member of the House of Lords
After losing his Commons seat to Valerie Davey in the 1997 general election, he entered the House of Lords being created a life peer as Baron Waldegrave of North Hill, of Chewton Mendip in the County of Somerset, on 28 July 1999.

Private sector
Lord Waldegrave was a Director of Adam & Company, a member of the Royal Bank of Scotland Group, from 2017 to 2018. He has been a Director of Coutts & Company, also a member of the Royal Bank of Scotland Group, since 2012. He is currently non-executive director of GW Pharmaceuticals, which is involved in the cannabis business.

Personal life
He is married to Caroline Burrows, cookery writer and managing director of Leith's School of Food and Wine. They have four children, Katherine, Elizabeth, James and Harriet.

Waldegrave is a trustee of Cumberland Lodge, an educational charity. He is an active member of the Board of Managers for the Lewis Walpole Library, Yale University.

Other notable events
Waldegrave attended Bilderberg Group meetings four times: 1987, 1988, 1990 and 1995.

In 1993, when he was the British science minister Waldegrave offered a prize for the best lay explanation of the Higgs Boson. He had observed that British taxpayers were paying a lot of money (in contributions to CERN) for something very few of them understood, and he challenged UK particle physicists to explain, in a simple manner on one piece of paper, 'What is the Higgs Boson, and why do we want to find it?'

Professor David Miller's metaphor, which he entitled "A quasi-political explanation of the Higgs boson", is probably the most quoted explanation of the Higgs Boson and won the prize:

Miller asked his listeners to imagine a room full of Conservative party workers quietly talking to one another. This represents the Higgs field in space.
A former Conservative Prime Minister enters the room. All the workers she passes are strongly attracted to her. As she moves through the room, the cluster of admirers around her create resistance to her movement, and she becomes 'heavier'. This can be imagined as how a particle moves through the Higgs field. The field clusters around a particle, resisting its motion and giving it mass.
If a sleazy rumour crosses the room, it creates the same sort of clustering. The workers gather together to hear the details, the cluster can move across the room as the workers pass on the details to their neighbours. This cluster is the Higgs particle or Higgs Boson.

Further reading
Waldegrave, William: A Different Kind of Weather - A Memoir, Constable (2015);

References

External links

Announcement of his introduction at the House of Lords House of Lords minutes of proceedings, 19 October 1999
A more recent picture: http://cdn.mattchedit.com/cms/LIVE/businesslife.co/resources/rsz_lord_waldegrave__martin_hall.jpg
First interviewed by Alan Macfarlane 12th and 13th June 2011 (video)
Second interview 28th June 2013 (video)

|-

|-

|-

|-

|-

|-

|-

1946 births
21st-century memoirists
Agriculture ministers of the United Kingdom
Alumni of Corpus Christi College, Oxford
Chancellors of the Duchy of Lancaster
Waldegrave
Conservative Party (UK) MPs for English constituencies
Conservative Party (UK) life peers
English memoirists
People educated at Eton College
Fellows of All Souls College, Oxford
Fellows of Corpus Christi College, Oxford
Harvard University alumni
Kennedy Scholarships
Living people
Members of the Privy Council of the United Kingdom
People from Mendip District
People from Somerset
Presidents of the Oxford Union
Presidents of the Oxford University Conservative Association
Secretaries of State for Health (UK)
UK MPs 1979–1983
UK MPs 1983–1987
UK MPs 1987–1992
UK MPs 1992–1997
Waldegrave family
Younger sons of earls
Life peers created by Elizabeth II
Chief Secretaries to the Treasury
Provosts of Eton College